Ferdinand, comte de Marsin (or Marchin) (February 10, 1656 – September 9, 1706) was a French general and diplomat, who was Marshal of France.

Biography
He was born in Liège as the son of John Gaspar Ferdinand de Marchin, Comte de Granville and Marie de Balzac d'Entragues.
 
Marsin served in Flanders, and was wounded at the Battle of Fleurus (1690). He took part in the Battle of Neerwinden and the siege of Charleroi.

In 1701–1702 he was French ambassador in Spain.

In the War of the Spanish Succession, he was present at the Battle of Luzzara.
He became marshal in 1703, after the battle of Speyerbach.

In 1704 he was defeated at the Battle of Blenheim, together with Tallard, and was mortally wounded at the Battle of Turin. Imprisoned in the same city, he died a few days later.

Sources
Biography of Ferdinand comte de Marchin

1656 births
1706 deaths
Military personnel from Liège
Marshals of France
French military personnel of the Nine Years' War
French army commanders in the War of the Spanish Succession